Portia Zvavahera (born 1985) is a Zimbabwean painter.

Early life 
Zvavahera was born in Zimbabwe. She studied at the BAT Visual Arts Studio at the National Gallery of Zimbabwe from 2003 to 2005 and obtained a diploma in visual arts from Harare Polytechnic in 2006, where she was taught by the Zimbabwean artist and printmaker Chiko Chazunguza. Many of her paintings incorporate block-printed elements using oil-based printing ink.

Career 
In 2009, Zvavahera was an artist-in-residence at Greatmore Studios in Cape Town, South Africa. Zvavahera represented Zimbabwe at the 55th Venice Biennale in 2013 as part of the exhibition Dudziro: Interrogating the Visions of Religious Beliefs. She joined Stevenson, South Africa, in 2013. Previously, Zvavahera exhibited her work at the National Gallery of Zimbabwe and at Gallery Delta. 

She won South Africa's Tollman Award for the Visual Arts in 2013 and South Africa's  FNB (First National Bank) Art Prize in 2014. In 2017, Zvavahera participated in a three-month residency at the Gasworks in London, United Kingdom, supported by the Institute of Contemporary Art Indian Ocean (ICAIO).

References

External links 

 Gallery Delta profile
 Stevenson profile
 Gasworks profile

21st-century Zimbabwean painters

1985 births
Living people